Operation Essential Harvest (or Task Force Harvest) was a deployment mission in the Republic of Macedonia by NATO, officially launched on August 22, 2001, and effectively started on August 27. Because national contributions were larger than expected, the force ultimately grew to approximately 4,800 troops. Troops from the 2nd Battalion The Parachute Regiment and members of the SAS working in the A.O.R. The operation was headquartered in a fruit processing plant called Tri Kruši in Dracevo.

Background
"Although France was not a member of the NATO integrated command structure, then President Chirac had begun to reintegrate into the military structure of the Alliance in order to allow for French participation in combined operations in Bosnia under NATO command. . . . At the summit in Freiburg on 12 June, Chirac's suggestion for military cooperation with German units within NATO was confirmed by Schröder and put in place by the foreign and defence ministers of the two countries on 5 July. Both countries cooperated in NATO Operation Essential Harvest – two German, two French and one Spanish companies were placed under the overall French Command."

Battle of Tetovo
The Battle of Tetovo occurred in the beginning of January 2001 which also involved NATO and the Macedonian Armies to disarm Albanian insurgents who had occupied a number of cities, towns and villages in the Republic of Macedonia. This battle lasted until November 2001.

Operation Amber Fox
Following the conclusion of Operation Essential Harvest and at the request of the Macedonian President, NATO established Operation Amber Fox, to allow for a continuing NATO presence in the country.

See also
 2001 insurgency in Macedonia
 Operation Amber Fox

References

Further reading
Press Briefing held on 12 September 2001 at the NATO Press Centre in Skopje. NATO.

Essential Harvest
2001 insurgency in Macedonia
NATO intervention in the former Yugoslavia
Essential Harvest
Essential Harvest
Essential Harvest